The 1933 Victorian Football Association season was the 55th season of the Australian rules football competition. The premiership was won by the Northcote Football Club, after it defeated Coburg by 16 points in the Grand Final on 7 October. It was the club's third VFA premiership, and the second in a sequence of three premierships won consecutively from 1932 until 1934.

Central ground 
Through 1933, the Association secured the Motordrome (which was renamed Olympic Park during the season after its concrete motor racing track was demolished) to use as a central venue. The venue hosted all finals, and served as a neutral venue for some home-and-home matches. Moves to expand its use as a central venue in 1934 led to a dispute between the Association and the councils which ran the suburban grounds.

Premiership 
The home-and-home season was played over twenty-two matches, before the top four clubs contested a finals series to determine the premiers for the season. The finals series was played for the first time under the Page–McIntyre system, which replaced the amended Argus system which had been in use since 1903.

Starting from this season, percentage was calculated as the number of points scored per hundred points conceded, which is consistent with the modern definition. Until this year, it had been calculated as points conceded per hundred points scored.

Ladder

Finals

Grand Final

Awards 
 Bill Luff (Camberwell) was the leading goalkicker for the season; he kicked 106 goals in the home-and-home season and did not participate in finals.
 In addition to the Recorder Cup, a second Association best-and-fairest award, known as the Association Medal or V.F.A. Medal, was introduced in 1933 under a different voting system.
 Charlie Stanbridge (Williamstown) won the Recorder Cup, polling seven votes. L. Smith (Northcote) finished second with six votes, and Dave Withers (Oakleigh) finished third with 4½ votes.
 The Association Medal was jointly won by Charlie Stanbridge (Williamstown) and Dave Withers (Oakleigh), who each polled 36 votes; Bob Ross (Northcote) finished third with 32 votes.
 Brunswick won the seconds premiership for the third consecutive time. Brunswick 9.19 (73) defeated Port Melbourne 3.12 (30) in the Grand Final on Thursday 28 September (Show Day holiday) at Coburg.

External links 
 List of VFA premiers

References 

Victorian Football League seasons
VFL